Cilli may refer to:

 Cilli, German name for Celje, Slovenian town
 County of Cilli, a medieval county in Slovenia
 Daniele Cilli (born 1988), Italian professional football

See also
 Catherine of Cilli (disambiguation)